In vertebrate anatomy, the pituitary gland, or hypophysis, is an endocrine gland, about the size of a chickpea and weighing, on average,  in humans. It is a protrusion off the bottom of the hypothalamus at the base of the brain. The hypophysis rests upon the hypophyseal fossa of the sphenoid bone in the center of the middle cranial fossa and is surrounded by a small bony cavity (sella turcica) covered by a dural fold (diaphragma sellae). 

The anterior pituitary (or adenohypophysis) is a lobe of the gland that regulates several physiological processes including stress (by secreting ACTH), growth (by secreting GH), reproduction (by secreting FSH and LH), metabolism rate (by secreting TSH) and lactation (by secreting prolactin). The intermediate lobe synthesizes and secretes melanocyte-stimulating hormone. The posterior pituitary (or neurohypophysis) is a lobe of the gland that is functionally connected to the hypothalamus by the median eminence via a small tube called the pituitary stalk (also called the infundibular stalk or the infundibulum). It regulates hydroelectrolytic stability (by secreting ADH), uterine contraction during labor and human attachment (by secreting oxytocin).

Hormones secreted from the pituitary gland help to control growth, blood pressure, energy management, all functions of the sex organs, thyroid glands and metabolism as well as some aspects of pregnancy, childbirth, breastfeeding, water/salt concentration at the kidneys, temperature regulation and pain relief.

Structure
The pituitary gland, in humans, is oval in shape and is a pea-sized gland that sits in a protective bony enclosure called the sella turcica. It is composed of two lobes: anterior and posterior, with the intermediate lobe that joins the two regions. In many animals, these three lobes are distinct. The intermediate is avascular and almost absent in human beings. The intermediate lobe is present in many animal species, in particular in rodents, mice and rats, that have been used extensively to study pituitary development and function. In all animals, the fleshy, glandular anterior pituitary is distinct from the neural composition of the posterior pituitary, which is an extension of the hypothalamus.

The height of the pituitary gland ranges from 5.3 to 7.0 mm. The volume of the pituitary gland ranges from 200 to 440 mm3.

Anterior

The anterior pituitary arises from an invagination of the oral ectoderm (Rathke's pouch). This contrasts with the posterior pituitary, which originates from neuroectoderm.

Endocrine cells of the anterior pituitary are controlled by regulatory hormones released by parvocellular neurosecretory cells in the hypothalamic capillaries leading to infundibular blood vessels, which in turn lead to a second capillary bed in the anterior pituitary. This vascular relationship constitutes the hypothalamo-hypophyseal portal system. Diffusing out of the second capillary bed, the hypothalamic releasing hormones then bind to anterior pituitary endocrine cells, upregulating or downregulating their release of hormones.

The anterior lobe of the pituitary can be divided into the pars tuberalis (pars infundibularis) and pars distalis (pars glandularis) that constitutes ~80% of the gland. The pars intermedia (the intermediate lobe) lies between the pars distalis and the pars tuberalis, and is rudimentary in the human, although in other species it is more developed. It develops from a depression in the dorsal wall of the pharynx (stomal part) known as Rathke's pouch.

The anterior pituitary contains several different types of cells that synthesize and secrete hormones. Usually there is one type of cell for each major hormone formed in anterior pituitary. With special stains attached to high-affinity antibodies that bind with distinctive hormone, at least 5 types of cells can be differentiated.

Posterior

The posterior lobe develops as an extension of the hypothalamus, from the floor of the third ventricle. The posterior pituitary hormones are synthesized by cell bodies in the hypothalamus. The magnocellular neurosecretory cells, of the supraoptic and paraventricular nuclei located in the hypothalamus, project axons down the infundibulum to terminals in the posterior pituitary. This simple arrangement differs sharply from that of the adjacent anterior pituitary, which does not develop from the hypothalamus.

The release of pituitary hormones by both the anterior and posterior lobes is under the control of the hypothalamus, albeit in different ways.

Functions

Anterior
The anterior pituitary synthesizes and secretes hormones. All releasing hormones (-RH) referred to, can also be referred to as releasing factors (-RF).

Somatotropes:
 Human growth hormone (HGH), also referred to as 'growth hormone' (GH), and also as somatotropin, is released under the influence of hypothalamic growth hormone-releasing hormone (GHRH), and is inhibited by hypothalamic somatostatin.

Corticotropes:
 Cleaved from the precursor proopiomelanocortin protein, and include adrenocorticotropic hormone (ACTH), and beta-endorphin, and melanocyte-stimulating hormone are released under the influence of hypothalamic corticotropin-releasing hormone (CRH).

Thyrotropes:
 Thyroid-stimulating hormone (TSH), is released under the influence of hypothalamic thyrotropin-releasing hormone (TRH) and is inhibited by somatostatin.

Gonadotropes:
 Luteinizing hormone (LH).
 Follicle-stimulating hormone (FSH), both released under influence of Gonadotropin-releasing Hormone (GnRH)

Lactotropes:
 Prolactin (PRL), whose release is inconsistently stimulated by hypothalamic TRH, oxytocin, vasopressin, vasoactive intestinal peptide, angiotensin II, neuropeptide Y, galanin, substance P, bombesin-like peptides (gastrin-releasing peptide, neuromedin B and C), and neurotensin, and inhibited by hypothalamic dopamine.

These hormones are released from the anterior pituitary under the influence of the hypothalamus. Hypothalamic hormones are secreted to the anterior lobe by way of a special capillary system, called the hypothalamic-hypophysial portal system.

There is also a non-endocrine cell population called folliculostellate cells.

Intermediate
The intermediate lobe synthesizes and secretes the following important endocrine hormone:
 Melanocyte–stimulating hormone (MSH). This is also produced in the anterior lobe. When produced in the intermediate lobe, MSHs are sometimes called "intermedins".

Posterior
The posterior pituitary stores and secretes (but does not synthesize) the following important endocrine hormones:

Magnocellular neurons:
 Antidiuretic hormone (ADH, also known as vasopressin and arginine vasopressin AVP), the majority of which is released from the supraoptic nucleus in the hypothalamus.
 Oxytocin, most of which is released from the paraventricular nucleus in the hypothalamus. Oxytocin is one of the few hormones to create a positive feedback loop. For example, uterine contractions stimulate the release of oxytocin from the posterior pituitary, which, in turn, increases uterine contractions. This positive feedback loop continues throughout labour.

Hormones
Hormones secreted from the pituitary gland help control the following body processes:
 Growth (GH)
 Blood pressure
 Some aspects of pregnancy and childbirth including stimulation of uterine contractions
 Breast milk production
 Sex organ functions in both sexes
 Thyroid gland function
 Metabolic conversion of food into energy
 Water and osmolarity regulation in the body
 Water balance via the control of reabsorption of water by the kidneys
 Temperature regulation
 Pain relief

Clinical significance

Some of the diseases involving the pituitary gland are:
 Central diabetes insipidus caused by a deficiency of vasopressin
 Gigantism and acromegaly caused by an excess of growth hormone in childhood and adult, respectively
 Hypothyroidism caused by a deficiency of thyroid-stimulating hormone
 Hyperpituitarism, the increased (hyper) secretion of one or more of the hormones normally produced by the pituitary gland
 Hypopituitarism, the decreased (hypo) secretion of one or more of the hormones normally produced by the pituitary gland
 Panhypopituitarism a decreased secretion of most of the pituitary hormones
 Pituitary tumours
 Pituitary adenomas, noncancerous tumors that occur in the pituitary gland

All of the functions of the pituitary gland can be adversely affected by an over- or under-production of associated hormones.

The pituitary gland is important for mediating the stress response, via the hypothalamic–pituitary–adrenal axis (HPA axis) Critically, pituitary gland growth during adolescence can be altered by early life stress such as childhood maltreatment or maternal dysphoric behavior.

It has been demonstrated that, after controlling for age, sex, and BMI, larger quantities of DHEA and DHEA-S tended to be linked to larger pituitary volume. Additionally, a correlation between pituitary gland volume and Social Anxiety subscale scores was identified which provided a basis for exploring mediation.  Again controlling for age, sex, and BMI, DHEA and DHEA-S have been found to be predictive of larger pituitary gland volume, which was also associated with increased ratings of social anxiety. This research provides evidence that pituitary gland volume mediates the link between higher DHEA(S) levels (associated with relatively early adrenarche) and traits associated with social anxiety. Children who experience early adrenarcheal development tend to have larger pituitary gland volume compared to children with later adrenarcheal development.

History

Etymology

Pituitary gland
The Greek physician Galen referred to the pituitary gland by only using the (Ancient Greek) name ἀδήν, gland. He described the pituitary gland as part of a series of secretory organs for the excretion of nasal mucus. Anatomist Andreas Vesalius translated ἀδήν with glans, in quam pituita destillat, "gland in which slime (pituita) drips". Besides this 'descriptive' name, Vesalius used glandula pituitaria, from which the English name pituitary gland is ultimately derived.

The expression glandula pituitaria is still used as official synonym beside hypophysis in the official Latin nomenclature Terminologia Anatomica. In the seventeenth century the supposed function of the pituitary gland to produce nasal mucus was debunked. The expression glandula pituitaria and its English equivalent pituitary gland can only be justified from a historical point of view. The inclusion of this synonym is merely justified by noting that the main term hypophysis is a much less popular term.

Hypophysis

Note: hypophysial (or hypophyseal) means "related to the hypophysis (pituitary gland)".

The anatomist Samuel Thomas von Sömmerring coined the name hypophysis. This name consists of ὑπό ('under') and φύειν ('to grow'). In later Greek ὑπόφυσις is used differently by Greek physicians as outgrowth. Sömmering also used the equivalent expression appendix cerebri, with appendix as appendage. In various languages, Hirnanhang in German and hersenaanhangsel in Dutch, the terms are derived from appendix cerebri.

Other animals
The pituitary gland is found in all vertebrates, but its structure varies among different groups.

The division of the pituitary described above is typical of mammals, and is also true, to varying degrees, of all tetrapods. However, only in mammals does the posterior pituitary have a compact shape. In lungfish, it is a relatively flat sheet of tissue lying above the anterior pituitary, but in amphibians, reptiles, and birds, it becomes increasingly well developed. The intermediate lobe is, in general, not well developed in any species and is entirely absent in birds.

The structure of the pituitary in fish, apart from the lungfish, is generally different from that in other animals. In general, the intermediate lobe tends to be well developed, and may equal the remainder of the anterior pituitary in size. The posterior lobe typically forms a sheet of tissue at the base of the pituitary stalk, and in most cases sends irregular finger-like projection into the tissue of the anterior pituitary, which lies directly beneath it. The anterior pituitary is typically divided into two regions, a more anterior rostral portion and a posterior proximal portion, but the boundary between the two is often not clearly marked. In elasmobranchs there is an additional, ventral lobe beneath the anterior pituitary proper.

The arrangement in lampreys, which are among the most primitive of all fish, may indicate how the pituitary originally evolved in ancestral vertebrates. Here, the posterior pituitary is a simple flat sheet of tissue at the base of the brain, and there is no pituitary stalk. Rathke's pouch remains open to the outside, close to the nasal openings. Closely associated with the pouch are three distinct clusters of glandular tissue, corresponding to the intermediate lobe, and the rostral and proximal portions of the anterior pituitary. These various parts are separated by meningial membranes, suggesting that the pituitary of other vertebrates may have formed from the fusion of a pair of separate, but associated, glands.

Most armadillos also possess a neural secretory gland very similar in form to the posterior pituitary, but located in the tail and associated with the spinal cord. This may have a function in osmoregulation.

There is a structure analogous to the pituitary in the octopus brain.

Intermediate lobe
Although rudimentary in humans (and often considered part of the anterior pituitary), the intermediate lobe located between the anterior and posterior pituitary is important to many animals. For instance, in fish, it is believed to control physiological color change. In adult humans, it is just a thin layer of cells between the anterior and posterior pituitary. The intermediate lobe produces melanocyte-stimulating hormone (MSH), although this function is often (imprecisely) attributed to the anterior pituitary.

The intermediate lobe is, in general, not well developed in tetrapods, and is entirely absent in birds.

See also
 Head and neck anatomy
 Chromophobe cell
 Melanotroph
 Chromophil
 Acidophil cell
 Basophil cell
 Oxyphil cell (parathyroid)
 Neuroendocrine cell

References

External links

 
 
 The Pituitary Gland, from the UMM Endocrinology Health Guide 
 Oklahoma State, Endocrine System
 The Pituitary Foundation
 The Pituitary Network Association -- pituitary.org

 
Endocrine system
Human head and neck
Neuroendocrinology
Human female endocrine system
Articles containing video clips